EFLC may refer to:

EFL Championship, a division of English football
EFL Cup, or League Cup, an annual English football tournament
Grand Theft Auto: Episodes from Liberty City, a standalone expansion for Grand Theft Auto IV